LakhnichakAulai is a village in Vaishali district, Bihar, India.

Geography
Ahmadpur LakhnichakAulai is located at

Village profile
 State: Bihar
 District: Vaishali district
 Sub-district: Hajipur

Area details
 Area of village (in hectares): 52
 Number of households: 241

population
 Total population: 1,646
 Total male population: 874
 Total female  population: 772
 Scheduled castes population (total): 398
 Scheduled castes male: 203
 Scheduled castes female: 195

Education facilities
 Number of primary schools: 1
 Middle school available with in range: within 5 km
 College available within range: within 5 km

Medical facilities
 Allopathic hospitals Shreya Health Care, Suresh Prasad Chowk, Bidupur RS Hajipur vaishali,  available with in range: Between 1 km and 10 km
 Primary health centre available within range: within 5 km
 Maternity and child welfare centre available with in range: more than 10 km

Post, telegraph and telephone facilities
 Post, telegraph and phone facilities: available
 Post office available: within 5 km
 Telephone connections available: within 5 km

Transportation
 Bus services available within range: more than 10 km
 Railway service available within range: within 5 km
 Navigable water way available within range: more than 10 km

Banking facilities
 Commercial bank available within range: within 5 km
 Co-operative bank Available within range: more than 10 km

Recreational and cultural facilities 
 Cinema and video-hall available with in range: more than 10 km
 Sports club available range: more than 10 km
 Stadium /auditorium available with in range: more than 10 km

Approach to villages
 Nearest town: HajipurNearest station Akshywat Nagar Bidupur Nearest Chowk:Suresh prasad Chowk near akshywat stadium Bidupur stadium stadium Bidupur 
 Distance from the nearest town: 15 km

Power supply
 Power supply facilities: available
 Electricity for domestic use: 01
 Electricity of agricultural use: 01

Newspapers and magazines
 Newspaper and magazine facilities: available
 Newspaper: available
 Magazine: available

Land use in hectares
 Total irrigated area: 0.00
 Non-irrigated area: 29.10
 Culturable waste (including gauchar and groves): 16.40
 Area not available for cultivation: 6.34

References

Villages in Vaishali district